Diplopodomyces is a genus of fungi in the family Laboulbeniaceae. It contains six species, all found externally on millipedes.

Species:
Diplopodomyces callipodos
Diplopodomyces coronatus
Diplopodomyces liguliphorus
Diplopodomyces lusitanipodos
Diplopodomyces ramosus
Diplopodomyces veneris

References

External links
Diplopodomyces at Index Fungorum

Laboulbeniomycetes